Messier 107 or M107, also known as NGC 6171, is a very loose globular cluster in a very mildly southern part of the sky close to the equator in Ophiuchus, and is the last such object in the Messier Catalogue.

Observational history, namings and guide
It was discovered by Pierre Méchain in April 1782, then independently by William Herschel in 1793. Herschel's son, John, in his 1864 General Catalogue, described it as a "globular cluster of stars, large, very rich, very much compressed, round, well resolved, clearly consisting of stars". It was not until 1947 that Helen Sawyer Hogg added it and three other objects found by Méchain to the modern Catalogue, the latter having contributed several of the suggested observation objects which Messier had verified and added. The cluster is to be found 2.5° south and slightly west of the star Zeta Ophiuchi.

Properties

It is an Oosterhoff type I cluster with a metallicity of −0.95 and it conforms with the bulk of the halo population. There are 22 known RR Lyrae variable stars in this cluster and a probable SX Phoenicis variable.

Gallery

See also
 List of Messier objects

References and footnotes

External links

 SEDS: Globular Cluster M107
 Messier 107, Galactic Globular Clusters Database page
 

Globular clusters
Ophiuchus (constellation)
107
Messier 107
Astronomical objects discovered in 1782
Discoveries by Pierre Méchain